Claudie Minor is a former offensive tackle in the National Football League who played nine seasons for the Denver Broncos.

1951 births
Living people
American football offensive linemen
Denver Broncos players
San Diego State Aztecs football players